Frankfort is an unincorporated community in Franklin County, Alabama, United States.

History
The name Frankfort comes from a combination of Franklin (the county) and fort. In 1849, Franklin County consisted of all of current Franklin County and Colbert County. A vote was held to move the county seat to a more central location from Russellville, and Frankfort was founded in that location. The courthouse and jail were built from local-made brick. In 1879, the county seat was moved to Belgreen. A post office operated under the name Frankfort from 1852 to 1909.

The Frankfort (stone) meteorite, a Howardite meteorite, fell in Frankfort on December 5, 1868.

References

Unincorporated communities in Franklin County, Alabama
Unincorporated communities in Alabama